{{Infobox settlement
| name                    = Novi Pazar
| native_name_lang        = sr
| native_name             = 
| official_name           = City of Novi Pazar
| other_name              = 
| settlement_type         = City
| image_skyline           = 
{{Photomontage|position=center
| photo1a                 = Novi Pazar - noc.jpg
| photo2a                 = Manastir Đurđrvi stupovi - Monastery The Tracts of Saint George.jpg
| photo2b                 = Manastir Sopoćani - Monastery Sopocani.jpg
| photo3a                 = Novopazarska tvrđava 3.jpg
| photo3b                 = Novi Pazar at the Pester Plateau in Serbia 8244.NEF 14.jpg
| photo4a                 = Zgrada-uninp.jpg
| photo4b                 = Petrova crkva (by Pudelek) 2.JPG
| size                    = 280
| spacing                 = 1
| color                   = #FFFFFF
| border                  = 1
| foot_montage            = From top: City panorama at night, Monastery The Tracts of Saint George, The Sopoćani monastery, Novi Pazar Fortress, Altun-Alem Mosque, International University of Novi Pazar, Church of the Holy Apostles Peter and Paul, Ras}}
| image_caption           = 
| image_flag              = 
| image_shield            = Novi Pazar (Grb).png
| image_map               = 
| mapsize                 = 
| map_caption             = 
| pushpin_map_caption     = Location within Serbia##Location within Europe
| pushpin_relief          = 1
| pushpin_map             = Serbia#Balkans#Europe
| coordinates             = 
| established_title       = Founded
| established_date        = 1461
| subdivision_type        = Country
| subdivision_name        = 
| subdivision_type1       = Region
| subdivision_name1       = Šumadija and Western Serbia
| subdivision_type2       = District
| subdivision_name2       = Raška
| parts_type              = Settlements
| parts_style             = para
| p1                      = 100
| leader_party            = SDP
| leader_title            = Mayor
| leader_name             = Nihat Biševac
| unit_pref               = Metric
| area_rank               = 31st in Serbia
| area_blank1_title       = Urban
| area_blank1_km2         = 15.34
| area_blank2_title       = Administrative
| area_blank2_km2         = 742
| area_footnotes          = 
| elevation_footnotes     = 
| elevation_m             = 477
| elevation_min_footnotes = 
| elevation_min_m         = 
| elevation_max_footnotes = 
| elevation_max_m         = 
| population_as_of        = 2011 census
| population_rank         = 14th in Serbia
| population_footnotes    = 
| population_blank1_title = Urban
| population_blank1       = 66,527
| population_density_blank1_km2 = auto
| population_blank2_title = Administrative
| population_blank2       = 100,410
| population_density_blank2_km2 = auto
| timezone                = CET
| utc_offset              = +1
| timezone_DST            = CEST
| utc_offset_DST          = +2
| postal_code_type        = Postal code
| postal_code             = 36300363023630336316363183631936322
| area_code_type          = Area code
| area_code               = +381(0)20
| website                 = 
| iso_code                = SRB
| blank_name              = Car plates
| blank_info              = NP
| blank1_name             = Climate
| blank1_info             = Cfb
}}

Novi Pazar (lit. "New Bazaar") is a city located in the Raška District of southwestern Serbia. As of the 2011 census, the urban area has 66,527 inhabitants, while the city administrative area has 100,410 inhabitants. The city is the cultural center of the Bosniaks in Serbia and the region of Sandžak. A multicultural area of Muslims and Orthodox Christians, many monuments of both religions, like the Altun-Alem Mosque and the Church of the Holy Apostles Peter and Paul, are found in the region which has a total of 30 protected monuments of culture.

Name
During the 14th century under the old Serbian fortress of Stari Ras, an important market-place named Trgovište started to develop. By the middle of the 15th century, in the time of the final Ottoman Empire conquest of Old Serbia, another market-place was developing some 11 km to the east. The older place became known as Staro Trgovište (Old Trgovište) and the younger as Novo Trgovište (New Trgovište). The latter developed into the modern city of Novi Pazar.

The name "Novi Pazar" (meaning 'New Bazaar') was derived from the Serbian name Novo Trgovište, via the Turkish name Yeni Pazar, which is itself derived from bazaar. The city is known as Pazari i Ri or Tregu i Ri in Albanian and simply Novi Pazar in Bosnian. Aside from that it is still known as Yeni Pazar in modern-day Turkey.

Geography
Novi Pazar is located in the valleys of the Jošanica, Raška, Deževska, and Ljudska rivers. It lies at an elevation of 496m, in the southeast Raška region. The city is surrounded by the Golija and Rogozna mountains, and the Pešter plateau lies to the west. The total area of the city administrative area is 742 km². It contains 100 settlements, mostly small and spread over hills and mountains surrounding the city. The largest village is Mur, with over 3000 residents.

Climate
Novi Pazar has a humid continental climate (Köppen climate classification: Dfb) typical of the hilly Raška region. It is generally cooler than Serbia's other major cities, though still significantly warmer than the neighboring town of Sjenica.

History

One of the oldest monuments of the area is the Church of the Holy Apostles Peter and Paul first built in the Roman era. The capital city of the Principality of Serbia, Ras, which was ruled by the Vlastimirović dynasty from 768 to 980, was near the modern city and has been designated a UNESCO World Heritage Site.

In the next centuries, the region of modern Novi Pazar served as the principal province of the Serbian realm. It was an administrative division, usually under the direct rule of the monarch and sometimes as an appanage. It was the crownland, seat or appanage of various Serbian states throughout the Middle Ages, including the Serbian Kingdom (1217-1345) and the Serbian Empire (1345-1371). In 1427, the region and the remnant of Ras, as part of the Serbian Despotate, was ruled by Serbian despot Đurađ Branković. One of the markets was called "despotov trg" (Despot's square). In 1439, the region was captured by the Ottoman Empire, but was reconquered by the Serbian Despotate in 1444. In the summer of 1455, the Ottomans conquered the region again, and named the settlement of Trgovište Eski Bazar (Old Market). Novi Pazar was formally founded as a city in its own right in 1461 by Ottoman general Isa-Beg Ishaković, the Bosnian governor of the district (sanjak) who also founded Sarajevo. Ishaković decided to establish a new town on the area of Trgovište as an urban center between Raška and Jošanica, where at first he built a mosque, a public bath, a marketplace, a hostel, and a compound.

It was the chief town of the Ras province (vilayet) until its disestablishment in 1463, when it became part of the Jeleč Vilayet. The first written document which mentions Novi Pazar dates from the 15th century, and describes the decision of the Republic of Ragusa to appoint a consul there. The town was well developed by this time, being at the intersection of important routes leading to Dubrovnik, Niš, Sofia, Constantinople, Salonica, Sarajevo, Belgrade and Budapest. The town also remained the capital of the Sanjak of Novi Pazar, which continued until the 20th century as a constitutive unit of Bosnia Eyalet. The sanjak was occupied and administered by Austria-Hungary from 1878. In 1908 it was returned to the Ottoman Empire as part of the Kosovo Vilayet, but taken over by the Kingdom of Serbia in 1912, during the First Balkan War.

The area has traditionally had a large number of Albanians and Muslim Slavs with a different culture from the Orthodox Serbs. A contemporary report stated that when the Serb forces entered the Sandjak of Novi Pazar, they "pacified" the Albanians. In 1913, Novi Pazar officially became part of the Kingdom of Serbia, and as such, became part of the Kingdom of Yugoslavia in 1918. From 1929 to 1941, Novi Pazar was part of the Zeta Banovina of the Yugoslavia.

In the Battle for Novi Pazar, fought at the end of 1941 during the Second World War, the Chetniks, initially supported by the Partisans, unsuccessfully tried to capture the city. Following the overthrow of Slobodan Milošević on 5 October 2000, newly elected Prime Minister of Serbia Zoran Đinđić made considerable efforts to help economically the whole area of Novi Pazar. Also, with the help of Đinđić, the International University of Novi Pazar was founded in 2002. He made close relations with the leaders of Bosniaks, as part of his wider plan to reform Serbia. Twelve years following his assassination, the Novi Pazar Assembly decided to rename one street in his name.

Demographics

According to the last official census done in 2011, the municipality of Novi Pazar has 100,410 inhabitants, while the city itself has 68,749 inhabitants. A total of 68.47% of population live in urban area of the city. The population density is 135.32 inhabitants per square kilometer.

Novi Pazar has 23,022 households with 4,36 members on average; the number of homes is 28,688.

Religion structure in the city of Novi Pazar is predominantly Muslim (82,710), with Serbian Orthodox (16,051), Atheists (71), Catholics (51), and other minority groups. Most of the population speaks either Bosnian (74,501) or Serbian (23,406).

The composition of population by sex and average age:
 Male - 49,984 (32.90 years) and
 Female - 50,426 (34.14 years).

A total of 33,583 citizens (older than 15 years) have secondary education (44.41%), while the 7,351 citizens have higher education (9.72%). Of those with higher education, 5,005 (6.62%) have university education.

Ethnic composition

From the 15th century to the Balkan Wars, Novi Pazar was the capital of the sanjak of Novi Pazar. Typically, like other centres of the wider area, its composition was multiethnic, with Albanians, Serbs and Slavic-speaking Muslims as the largest ethnic groups of the city. The Ottoman travel writer Evliya Çelebi noted that it was one of the most populated towns in the Balkans in the 17th century. Jews also lived in the city until World War II. The entire Jewish population of Novi Pazar - 221 individuals, were imprisoned, sent to the concentration camp Staro Sajmište and killed during the rule of Aćif Hadžiahmetović.
The ethnic composition of the city administrative area:

Ethnic composition of the urban area of the city:

Settlements

Aside from the urban area of Novi Pazar (54,604), the city administrative area includes the following settlements, with population from the 2002 census:

 Aluloviće (362)
 Bajevica (563)
 Banja (466)
 Bare (36)
 Batnjik (58)
 Bekova (116)
 Bele Vode (872)
 Boturovina (218)
 Brđani (195)
 Brestovo (5)
 Čašić Dolac (76)
 Cokoviće (20)
 Deževa (238)
 Dojinoviće (120)
 Dolac (87)
 Doljani (89)
 Dragočevo (112)
 Dramiće (80)
 Golice (64)
 Gornja Tušimlja (33)
 Goševo (50)
 Gračane (28)
 Građanoviće (19)
 Grubetiće (259)
 Hotkovo (193)
 Ivanča (813)
 Izbice (1,949)
 Jablanica (27)
 Janča (332)
 Javor (18)
 Jova (21)
 Kašalj (35)
 Koprivnica (12)
 Kosuriće (125)
 Kovačevo (243)
 Kožlje (618)
 Kruševo (486)
 Kuzmičevo (133)
 Leča (319)
 Lopužnje (70)
 Lukare (489)
 Lukarsko Goševo (850)
 Lukocrevo (186)
 Miščiće (231)
 Muhovo (545)
 Mur (3,407)
 Negotinac (26)
 Odojeviće (50)
 Oholje (179)
 Okose (36)
 Osaonica (284)
 Osoje (966)
 Paralovo (982)
 Pasji Potok (42)
 Pavlje (178)
 Pilareta (26)
 Pobrđe (2,176)
 Polokce (117)
 Pope (83)
 Postenje (3,471)
 Požega (523)
 Požežina (251)
 Prćenova (159)
 Pusta Tušimlja (53)
 Pustovlah (28)
 Radaljica (152)
 Rajčinoviće (537)
 Rajčinovićka Trnava (208)
 Rajetiće (63)
 Rajkoviće (29)
 Rakovac (21)
 Rast (51)
 Šaronje (398)
 Šavci (247)
 Sebečevo (897)
 Sitniče (778)
 Skukovo (23)
 Slatina (297)
 Smilov Laz (8)
 Srednja Tušimlja (40)
 Štitare (77)
 Stradovo (19)
 Sudsko Selo (87)
 Tenkovo (89)
 Trnava (694)
 Tunovo (128)
 Varevo (501)
 Vever (18)
 Vidovo (90)
 Vitkoviće (30)
 Vojkoviće (36)
 Vojniće (115)
 Vranovina (329)
 Vučiniće (245)
 Vučja Lokva (15)
 Zabrđe (49)
 Zlatare (12)
 Žunjeviće (211)

Politics
Novi Pazar is governed by a city assembly composed of 47 councillors, a mayor and vice-mayor. After the last legislative election held in 2020, the local assembly is composed of the following groups:
 SDP - European Novi Pazar - Rasim Ljajić (21)
SPP - Muamer Zukorlić (11)
 SDA - Party of Democratic Action of Sandžak (9)

 Aleksandar Vučić - SNS, SPS, SRS (6)

Economy
Lying on crossroads between numerous old and new states, Novi Pazar has always been a strong trade center. Along with the trade, the city developed manufacturing tradition. During the 20th century, it became a center of textile industry.

Paradoxically, during the turbulent 1990s and, Novi Pazar prospered, even during the UN sanctions, boosted by the strong private initiative in textile industry. Jeans of Novi Pazar, first of forged trademarks, and later on its own labels, became famous throughout the region. However, during the relative economic prosperity in Serbia of the 2000s, the Novi Pazar economy collapsed, with demise of large textile combines in mismanaged privatization, and incoming competition from the import.

Economic figures
The following table gives a preview of total number of registered people employed in legal entities per their core activity (as of 2019):

Society and culture

Monuments
The old Serbian Orthodox monastery of Sopoćani, the foundation of St King Uroš I, built in the second half of the 13th century and located west of Novi Pazar, is a World Heritage Site since 1979 accompanying with Stari Ras (Old Ras), a medieval capital of the Serbian great župan Stefan Nemanja.By Their Fruit you will recognize them - Christianization of Serbia in Middle Ages, Perica Speher, 2010.

The city also houses the oldest intact church in Serbia and one of the oldest ones in the region which dates from the 9th-century, the Church of St Peter. The church's walls were defaced with graffiti on 6 April 2008. The police have not officially concluded why the incident occurred.

On a hilltop overlooking Novi Pazar is the 12th century monastery of Đurđevi stupovi'', long left in ruin, but recently restored and with a monastic community using it, with plate glass to keep out the weather and preserve the fine frescos. The main mosque of the city, the Altun-Alem Mosque, was built in the first half of the 16th century by architect Abdul Gani.

There are various other historic Ottoman buildings, such as the 17th-century Amir-agin Han, a 15th-century Hammam, and the 15th-century Turkish fortress (all gone but the walls, the site of which is now a walled park in the city centre).

Education

Novi Pazar is home to two universities, the International University of Novi Pazar and the State University of Novi Pazar.

Sport

The city's football club FK Novi Pazar was founded in 1928, under the name "FK Sandžak", which later changed to "FK Deževa". The club has played under its current name since 1962, when Deževa and another local football club, FK Ras, unified under this name. The club was a SFRJ amateur champion, and a member of the Yugoslav Second League. FK Novi Pazar qualified for a promotional play-off twice, but lost both times (to FK Sutjeska Nikšić in 1994, and to FK Sloboda Užice in 1995). FK Novi Pazar finally promoted to Serbian SuperLiga in 2011-12 season. FK Novi Pazar is the oldest second-league team in Serbia. Football is still an extremely popular sport in Novi Pazar and the city stadium is always full.

Volleyball clubs in the city are OK Novi Pazar (first league) and OK Koteks.

The Handball club is in the second league and used to have the name "Ras" but it was changed to RK Novi Pazar in 2004.

The Basketball club of the city is OKK Novi Pazar.

Famous athletes from the city include Turkish basketball national team player Mirsad Jahović Türkcan, former football player of Besiktas Sead Halilagić, handball-player Mirsad Terzić (who represents Bosnia and Herzegovina) and young football players Adem Ljajić, Ediz Bahtiyaroğlu, Armin Đerlek.

International cooperation

List of Novi Pazar's sister and twin cities:

  Bayrampaşa, Turkey
  İnegöl, Turkey
  Jagodina, Serbia
  Karatay, Turkey
  Kocaeli Province, Turkey
  Novi Pazar, Bulgaria
  Pendik, Turkey
  Vranje, Serbia
  Yalova, Turkey

Other friendships and cooperations, protocols, memorandums:

  Goražde, Bosnia and Herzegovina
  Ilidža, Bosnia and Herzegovina
  Podgorica, Montenegro
  Sarajevo, Bosnia and Herzegovina
  Sombor, Serbia

Gallery

Notable residents

Abdulah Gegić, former Partizan Belgrade football coach
 Almir Gegić, football player
 Aćif Hadžiahmetović, politician, mayor of Novi Pazar during Second World War
 Sead Halilagić, former football player
 Emina Jahović, pop singer
 Tahir Efendi Jakova, Albanian poet
 Adem Ljajić, football player
 Rasim Ljajić, Republic of Serbia Minister of Foreign and Domestic Trade and Telecommunications
 Erhan Mašović, football player
 Miljan Mutavdžić, footballer, former Serbian national team player
 Laza Ristovski (1956-2007), Yugoslav keyboardist, member of Smak and Bijelo Dugme
 Milunka Savić (1888–1973), the most-decorated female combatant in the entire history of warfare
 Mirsad Jahović Türkcan, Turkish basketball player 
 Bajro Župić,former footballer

References

External links

 

 
Populated places in Raška District
Sandžak
Municipalities and cities of Šumadija and Western Serbia